Andrew Jack Entrican (31 October 1858 – 19 February 1936) was an Irish-born New Zealand businessman and local-body politician. He was twice deputy mayor of Auckland.

Biography

Early life
Entrican was born at Stoneyfalls, near Strabane in County Tyrone, Ireland (now Northern Ireland) in 1858 to Robert Entrican, a local farmer, and his wife Jane (nee Jack) and was educated at Edwards School.

In 1883 he married Elizabeth Mackay with whom he had one son, Robert Gilbert (Bert) Entrican.

Business career
He began his business career in Derry with a firm of merchants. When he was 21 he emigrated to New Zealand arriving in Auckland in January 1880 on the ship Ben Nevis. After his arrival he became the assistant manager of a retail business owned by Charles Major, later taking it over himself in partnership with Samuel Taylor. This business was dissolved in 1885 and Entrican then became a commission agent. In 1887 he established the firm of A. J. Entrican and Company (later joined by his younger brother, James Cuthbertson Entrican), general merchants, and served as executive manager until his death. The firm built and occupied a building known as the Entrican Building at 36-38 Customs Street, Auckland (which is now known as Australis House). The company was renamed as A. J. Entrican, Sims & Co. Ltd. after a merger in 1932. After Andrew Entrican's death it was managed by his brother James and subsequently by his son Bert. The business was eventually sold to LD Nathan & Co. Ltd. in 1966.

Political career
In 1897 he was elected to the Auckland Harbour Board and the following year to the Auckland City Council. He resigned from the Harbour Board in 1899 but remained on the council until 1918, and again from 1920 until 1935. He served under 10 Mayors, and was deputy to six of them, holding that office for two separate terms for a combined 17 years. A popular councillor he was returned at the top of the City Council poll on three occasions. Entrican was returned to the Harbour Board in 1907 and remained a member until 1921, serving as chairman between 1910 and 1911.

He contested the  electorate as the Liberal Party candidate in the  where he polled third out of three candidates. The right-of-centre vote was split between the Liberal Party and Reform Party candidates, and the newly elected MP was one Michael Joseph Savage of the Labour Party.

He was also a trustee of the Auckland Savings Bank, a member of the executive of the Auckland Patriotic Association, the Auckland Fire Board, the Auckland and Suburban Drainage Board. He was a member of the Ulstermen's Association and was a staunch member of St. James Presbyterian Church in Mount Eden.

Death
He died on 19 February 1936 of a stroke. Entrican Avenue in Remuera, Auckland, was named after him in 1939.

References

1858 births
1936 deaths
Irish emigrants to New Zealand (before 1923)
New Zealand businesspeople
Auckland City Councillors
Deputy mayors of places in New Zealand
New Zealand Liberal Party politicians
Unsuccessful candidates in the 1919 New Zealand general election
20th-century New Zealand politicians
Auckland Harbour Board members
Andrew